Curio acaulis is a succulent plant of the family Asteraceae that is native to South Africa, Lesotho and Eswatini.

Description
It is similar in appearance to Curio repens, but its leaves are darker green and more elongated, and its flowers are bright yellow.

References

acaulis
Flora of South Africa
Garden plants
Drought-tolerant plants